A judicial retention election (or retention referendum) is a periodic process in some jurisdictions whereby a judge is subject to a referendum held at the same time as a general election. The judge is removed from office if a majority of votes are cast against retention.

A judicial retention vote differs from a regular election in that voters are not asked to choose from a list of candidates — the judges on the ballot do not have opponents.  Rather, the voter chooses between electing the incumbent judge to a further term in office (i.e. voting in favor of "retention") or voting against. In addition, the judge's party affiliation is typically not listed on the ballot. A judge is deemed to have been retained if ballots cast in favor of retention outnumber those against.

By way of example, judicial retention elections are used in the U.S. state of Illinois. In the 2008 general election, the voters of Cook County, Illinois were asked to vote on the following:

Additional instructions on the ballot made clear that "no judge listed is running against any other judge" and that voters were able to vote "yes" on both, "no" on both, or "yes" on one and "no" on the other.

History

California
In 1934, Judicial retention elections were first used by California's state court system to fill vacancies. (Text of the law may be seen below.) These retention elections served as an alternative to elections which were previously contested. After appointment by the governor and confirmation by the Commissioner on Judicial Appointments, an incumbent judge would appear on the ballot without an opponent and voters would vote for or against. Judges receiving a majority of votes would be elected to serve.

California State Constitution: Article VI, Section 16 d.
(1) Within 30 days before August 16 preceding the expiration of the judge's term, a judge of the Supreme Court or a court of appeal may file a declaration of candidacy to succeed to the office presently held by the judge. If the declaration is not filed, the Governor before September 16 shall nominate a candidate.  At the next general election, only the candidate so declared or nominated may appear on the ballot, which shall present the question whether the candidate shall be elected.  The candidate shall be elected upon receiving a majority of the votes on the question.

In 1937, the American Bar Association endorsed retention elections for judges.

Missouri Plan

Growing distaste of politics and corruption affecting the gubernatorial appointments of judges brought about the reform when selecting judges. In 1940, the state of Missouri adopted the Missouri Plan, which contained a judicial retention process similar to that of California. This plan which is also known as the merit system, was proposed by Albert M. Kales, co-founder of the American Judicature Society.  
Under the Missouri Plan, judges were to be nominated by a council of lawyers and laypersons. A list of candidates would then go to the governor, who would choose a candidate. It was noted that the Missouri Plan needed a form of public accountability so it was decided that, after an election cycle had passed, the judicial candidate would be subject to periodic, public retention elections.

Usage

Japan
The Constitution of Japan, drafted by the U.S. authorities during the occupation of Japan following World War II, effected a similar arrangement for justices of the Supreme Court of Japan.

United States
Retention elections are used in many U.S. state court systems to retain trial court and appellate court judges. The following 20 states use retention elections for at least some judges:

Alaska1,2
Arizona1,2 (some trial judges are elected). 
California1
Colorado1,2
Florida1
Illinois1,2
Indiana1,2 (some trial judges are elected). 
Iowa1,2
Kansas1,2 (some trial judges are elected). 
Maryland1
Missouri1,2 (some trial judges are elected). 
Nebraska1,2
New Mexico1,2 (57% 'yes' votes needed for retention)
Oklahoma1
Pennsylvania1,2
South Dakota1
Tennessee1
Utah1,2
Wyoming1,2

1 Appellate court retention election

2 Trial court retention election

Criticism
Many legal scholars disapprove of any form of judicial elections on the grounds that they may undermine the independence of the courts and encourage judges to act as politicians. It is argued that of the three branches of government (legislature, executive, and judiciary) the judicial branch should be the least concerned with public opinion, but that retention elections cause judges to take into account the view of the electorate when deciding cases. It is also argued that retention elections may lead to corruption because to successfully run for public office money and campaigning is needed. This may allow interest groups to take advantage of the system by giving money in exchange for favourable rulings by individual judges.

References

Iowa Judicial Branch, Judicial  Retention Elections

Elections in the United States
State court systems of the United States
Selection of judges in the United States